This is a listing of programs that HBO has commissioned or co-commissioned in its history.

Current programming

Drama

Comedy

Anthology

Co-productions

Unscripted

Docuseries

Reality

Variety

Sports

Upcoming programming

Drama

Comedy

Miniseries

Unscripted

Docuseries

Pilot orders

Comedy
The Franchise

In development

Drama
10,000 Ships
9 Voyages
Ascension
Asunda
The Big D
Blood Sugar
Empty Mansions 
Fledgling
Gang's All Queer
The Hater
Hellraiser
Invisible Life
The Last One Left
Loner
Luster
Maniac Cop
The Nigerwife
Ohio
Queens
Roadmarks
Scanners
Sphere
The Stationery Shop
Tales of Dunk and Egg
Untitled Ivanka Trump series
Untitled Michael Imperioli series
White Rabbit, Red Wolf
Who Fears Death

Comedy
Blood Sugar
Counterfeit
The Every
If You Lived with Me You'd Be Home by Now
Lucky
Nice White Parents
One for the Road
Pride
Sugar
Tre Cnt
Untitled Chris Kelly/Sarah Schneider project
Untitled David Spade project
Untitled Prentice Penny/Janine Nabers project
Untitled Ricky Velez project

Miniseries
Big Swiss
Black Flags
Cutblock
Doomsday Machine
Everyone in My Family Has Killed Someone
The Fact of a Body
A Fine Balance
King Rex
Lake Success
Londongrad
 My Dentist's Murder Trial
Mob Queens
Napoleon
Parasite
The Perfect Nanny
Poisonwood Bible
Rise and Kill First
Say Their Names
Serial
Sula
A Time for Mercy
Trust
Untitled Charles Randolph COVID-19 vaccine series
Untitled Jack Johnson series
Untitled SpaceX project
Valentine
The Vanishing Half

Former programming
The following is a list of HBO shows that have appeared on the channel in the past. Some of these shows may still be available on demand to HBO subscribers.

Drama

Comedy

Anthology

Miniseries

Animation

Adult animation

Kids & family

Unscripted

Docuseries

Reality

Variety

Sports

Notes

References

Programming
Programming
HBO
HBO